is a 2013 Japanese period comedy film directed by Kōki Mitani.

Cast
 Kōji Yakusho as Shibata Katsuie
 Yo Oizumi as Hashiba Hideyoshi
 Fumiyo Kohinata as Niwa Nagahide
 Kōichi Satō as Ikeda Tsuneoki
 Satoshi Tsumabuki as Oda Nobukatsu
 Bandō Minosuke II as Oda Nobutaka
 Tadanobu Asano as Maeda Toshiie
 Susumu Terajima as Kuroda Kanbei
 Kenichi Matsuyama as Hori Hidemasa
 Yūsuke Iseya as Oda Nobukane
 Kyōka Suzuki as Oichi
 Miki Nakatani as Nene
 Ayame Goriki as Matsuhime
 Keiko Toda as Naka
 Toshiyuki Nishida as Sarashina Rokubei
 Denden as Maeda Gen'i
 Eisuke Sasai as Oda Nobunaga
 Nakamura Kankurō VI as Oda Nobutada
 Kenji Anan as Takigawa Kazumasu
 Kazuyuki Asano as Akechi Mitsuhide
 Shōta Sometani as Mori Ranmaru
 Hinata Sasaki as Chacha
 Moeka Konno as Hatsu
 Itsuki Moriyama as Gō

Reception
By December 21, the film had grossed ¥2.87 billion (US$27.3 million) in Japan.

References

External links

The Kiyosu Conference  - Official
The Kiyosu Conference  - Toho

2013 comedy films
2013 films
Films directed by Kōki Mitani
Films produced by Kazutoshi Wadakura
Japanese comedy films
2010s historical comedy films
Films with screenplays by Kôki Mitani
Cultural depictions of Akechi Mitsuhide
Cultural depictions of Oda Nobunaga
Cultural depictions of Toyotomi Hideyoshi
Japanese historical films
2010s Japanese films